John Levee (April 10, 1924 – January 18, 2017) was an American abstract expressionist painter who had worked in Paris since 1949. His father was M. C. Levee.

Background
 
John Harrison Levee received a master's degree in philosophy from UCLA and became an aviator in the Second World War. After the war he decided to stay to work as a painter in Montparnasse. He studied art at the Art Center School in Los Angeles and at Académie Julian in Paris from 1949 to 1951.

His early painting was inspired by the New York School of abstract expressionism, which included Franz Kline, Robert Motherwell, Jackson Pollock, Mark Rothko, Ad Reinhardt, Willem de Kooning and Philip Guston, among others. After a period of hard-edge painting based on geometric abstraction in the 1960s, Levee returned to his more spontaneous abstract expressionist style, often using collage elements with loose brush work typical of lyrical abstraction.

Reference works in public collections
 Kunstmuseum Basel, Basel
 MoMA Museum of Modern Art, New York, New York
 Stedelijk Museum, Amsterdam
 Whitney Museum, New York, New York
 Guggenheim Museum, New York, New York
 Washington Gallery of Modern Art, Washington D.C.
 Centre Georges Pompidou, Paris
 Carnegie Museums of Pittsburgh, Pittsburgh, Pennsylvania
 Haifa Museum, Haifa, Israel
 Tel Aviv Museum of Art, Tel Aviv, Israel
 Baltimore Museum of Art, Baltimore, Maryland
 Phoenix Art Museum, Phoenix, Arizona
 Cincinnati Art Museum, Cincinnati, Ohio
 Santa Barbara Museum of Art, Santa Barbara, California
 Dallas Museum of Art Contemporary, Texas
 Palm Springs Desert Museum, California
 Boca Raton Museum of Art, Florida
 Hirshhorn Museum and Sculpture Garden Washington, D.C.

See also
Modern art
Abstract art
Formalism (art)
Shaped canvas
Abstract expressionism
Hard-edge painting

References

External links
John Levee’s death announced in Obituaries at Hyperallergic
John Levee 2009 Paris Retrospective

1924 births
Abstract expressionist artists
20th-century American painters
American male painters
21st-century American painters
21st-century American male artists
2017 deaths
American expatriates in France
Jewish American artists
University of California, Los Angeles alumni
American military personnel of World War II
21st-century American Jews
20th-century American male artists